Mango pudding is a very popular dessert in Hong Kong, where pudding is eaten as a traditional British food. 
There is very little variation between the regional mango pudding's preparation. The dessert is also found in Singapore, Malaysia, Thailand, Macau and is often served as dim sum in Chinese restaurants. 
The fresh variant is prepared by the restaurant or eatery and consists of agar or gelatin, mangoes, evaporated milk, and sugar.
In addition, fresh fruit such as mango, strawberries, berries and kiwifruit, are occasionally added as garnish. Served and eaten refrigerator cold, mango pudding has a rich and creamy texture.

Some Chinese restaurants make the mango pudding in fish shape because goldfish or koi expresses good luck in Chinese culture.

On the other hand, factory-made mango pudding does not contain fresh mangoes and instead, consists of mango essence and either gelatin or agar.

In supermarkets
Outside of dim sum and other restaurants, mango pudding can also be purchased at most Asian grocery stores or supermarkets. They can be purchased as a powder, which requires the addition of boiling milk or water to the powder, or in ready-to-eat portions.

See also

 Mango pomelo sago
 List of Chinese desserts
 List of desserts
 List of fruit dishes

References

Dim sum
Hong Kong desserts
Thai desserts and snacks
Malaysian desserts
Singaporean cuisine
Chinese desserts
Macau cuisine
Fruit dishes
Indian desserts